The 2019–20 UT Martin Skyhawks men's basketball team represented the University of Tennessee at Martin during the 2019–20 NCAA Division I men's basketball season. The Skyhawks, led by fourth-year head coach Anthony Stewart, played their home games at Skyhawk Arena as members of the Ohio Valley Conference. They finished the season 9–20, 5–13 in OVC play to finish in a tie for 10th place. They failed to qualify for the OVC tournament.

On November 15, 2020, head coach Anthony Stewart suddenly died at age 50.

Previous season 
The Skyhawks finished the 2018–19 season 12–19, 6-12 in OVC play to finish in seventh place. In the OVC tournament, they defeated Eastern Illinois in the first round, before falling to Jacksonville State in the quarterfinals.

Roster

Schedule and results

|-
!colspan=12 style=| Exhibition

|-
!colspan=12 style=| Non-conference regular season

|-
!colspan=9 style=| Ohio Valley regular season

|-

Source

References

UT Martin Skyhawks
UT Martin Skyhawks men's basketball seasons
UT Martin Skyhawks men's basketball
UT Martin Skyhawks men's basketball